Liu Ling or Ling Liu may refer to:

Liu Ling (Han dynasty) (died 122 BC), Han dynasty princess, Liu An's daughter
Liu Ling (poet) (221–300), Cao Wei and Jin dynasty poet and scholar, one of Seven Sages of the Bamboo Grove
Ling Liu (computer scientist), Chinese-born computer scientist at Georgia Institute of Technology, USA